Sir John Maria Emilio Gatti (13 August 1872 – 14 September 1929) was an Anglo-Swiss theatre manager, restaurateur and businessman who was also a prominent Conservative politician in London local government.

Born as Joannes Maria Aemilius Gatti in Dongio, in the canton of Ticino, Switzerland, he was the eldest son of the entrepreneur Agostino Gatti. The Gatti family had built up a large family business in Westminster, including the Adelphi and Vaudeville Theatres, a string of cafe-restaurants and the Charing Cross and Strand Electricity Supply Corporation Ltd, which supplied power to most of the West End of London.

Gatti was educated at Stonyhurst College and St John's College, Oxford, before being called to the bar at the Inner Temple. He married Lily Mary Lloyd in 1897 and they had seven children. In the same year his father died, and he took over the family businesses along with his younger brother Rocco Joseph Stefano Gatti.

His business interests, in particular the construction of electricity infrastructure, led him to become interested in the local government of the capital. In 1903 he was elected to Westminster City Council as a representative of the Charing Cross ward. He was a member of the Conservative-backed majority Moderate Party on the council, and was elected Mayor of Westminster for 1911–1912.

In 1908 he was a founding member of the Society of West End Theatre Managers. In 1919–1920 he was chairman of the society, and was involved in negotiating a standard theatrical contract for West End performers.

In 1918 Gatti was co-opted onto the London County Council as a Municipal Reform Party councillor for the Strand division. When elections resumed after World War I, he was elected a councillor for the Westminster Abbey division, holding the seat until his death. Gatti was short-listed to be Official Conservative candidate for the Westminster Abbey by-election in 1924, but lost out to Otho Nicholson who won the poll.

He served as chairman of the county council's finance committee for six years, and was chairman of the county council in 1927–1928. At the end of his term as chairman he received a knighthood.

Sir John Gatti died suddenly at Littleton Golf Club in September 1929 aged 57.

References

1872 births
1929 deaths
Members of London County Council
Members of the Inner Temple
People educated at Stonyhurst College
Alumni of St John's College, Oxford
British restaurateurs
Municipal Reform Party politicians
Members of Westminster Metropolitan Borough Council
Mayors of places in Greater London
Conservative Party (UK) councillors
Knights Bachelor
Swiss emigrants to the United Kingdom
Naturalised citizens of the United Kingdom